Cui Wei (Chinese:崔威; born April 7, 1983) is a Chinese footballer who plays as a defender.

Club career
Cui Wei began his club career with the Beijing Guoan youth team in 1998 and was considered to be a rising prospect that was good enough to be loaned out to German club Eintracht Frankfurt youth team in 1999. In 2003, he graduated into the senior Beijing Guoan squad where he quickly established himself within the team and won the 2003 Chinese FA Cup with the club. With the introduction of Lee Jang-soo as the Head coach at the beginning of the 2007 Chinese Super League season, Cui Wei would struggle to maintain his position within the team and he transferred to fellow top-tier club Changchun Yatai. At the beginning of the 2009 Chinese Super League season Cui Wei was loaned out to Guangzhou Pharmaceutical after being unable to gain a regular place with Changchun Yatai. He was released at the end of 2009 season. Cui returned to play professional football in 2013 when he joined China League One club Beijing Baxy. He transferred to Beijing BIT in March 2016.

Honours
Beijing Guoan
Chinese FA Cup: 2003
Chinese Football Super Cup: 2003

References

External links
Player profile at Sina.com
Player profile at football-lineups.com
Player profile at Guangzhou Pharmaceutical website

1983 births
Living people
Chinese footballers
Footballers from Beijing
Eintracht Frankfurt players
Chinese expatriate footballers
Beijing Guoan F.C. players
Changchun Yatai F.C. players
Guangzhou F.C. players
Beijing Sport University F.C. players
Chinese Super League players
China League One players
Association football defenders
21st-century Chinese people